Tverdostup Andriy Volodimirovich (Ukrainian: Твердоступ Андрій Володимирович, born June 18, 1977) is a Ukrainian sprinter who competed in the 2004 Summer Olympics. He is a member of Ukrainian National track and field Team (1996-2008) and a Member of Athletics Federation of Ukraine.

Track and field awards 

 May 17, 1996 - World Athletics Day - 400m (Odessa) - 1st place
 May 30, 1996 - International Athletic Tournament, (Rieka, Croatia), 400 m - 3rd place, relay 4*100m - 2nd place
 July 8, 1996 - Cup of Ukraine (Kiev) 400m - 2nd place
 August 21–25, 1996 - World Junior Championships (Sydney, Australia) -  15th place
 8 September - International Athletic Tournament (Grodno, Belarus) 400 meters - 1st place
 September 28, 1996 - European Championship Sports clubs (Magliano Wynette, Italy) 400m - 3rd place
 February 12, 1997- Championship of Ukraine (Lviv)  400m - 2nd place
 May 16, 1997 - International tournament (Schwechat, Austria)  400m - 3rd place
 May 23, 1997 - Cup of Ukraine (Kiev) 400m - 3rd place
 May 24, 1997 - European Cup (Prague, Czech Republic) relay 4*400m - 3rd place
 August 29, 1997 - International Competition (Bratislava, Slovakia) 400m - 2nd place
 August 30, 1997 - International Tournament (Nitra, Slovakia)  400m - 3rd place
 February 13, 1998 - Championship of Ukraine (Lviv) 400m - 1st place
 February 21, 1998 - Ukrainian Championship among juniors (Donetsk, Ukraine) 400m  - 1st place,  800m - 1st place
 May 20, 1998 - Ukrainian Championship among youth (Nikolaev) 400m - 1st place
 June 6, 1998 - European Cup (Budapest, Hungary) relay 4*400m - 2nd place
 June 13 - Grand Prix Sopot (Poland) 4*100m - 3rd place
 June 27, 1998 - Youth games of Ukraine (White- Church, Ukraine) 400m - 1st place
 July 31, 1998 - Championship of Ukraine (Kiev) 400m - II place, relay 4*400m - 1st place
 February 7, 1999 - Championship of Ukraine (Lviv) 800m - 1st place
 June 6, 1999 - European Cup (Saint-Petersburg, Russia) relay 4*400m - 1st place
 June 19, 1999 - International Tournament (Istanbul, Turkey) 800m - 1st place
 July 4, 1999 - Ukrainian Championship among youth (Bila Tserkva) 800m - 1st place
 September 23, 1999 - Dorm Olympics Ukraine (Kiev) relay 4*400m - 2nd place
 February 3, 2000 - Championship of Ukraine (Lviv) 400m - 2nd place
 February 25, 2000 - International Tournament (Delhi, India) 400m - 2nd place
 February 8, 2001- Ukrainian Championship (Lviv) 400m  - 1st place
 June 15, 2001 - International Tournament (Bydgoszcz, Poland) relay 4*400m - 2nd place
 June 24, 2001- European Cup Relay race 4*400m - 1st place
 July 8, 2001 - International Tournament (Tel Aviv, Israel) 400m - 1st place
 August 11, 2001 - World Championships (Edmonton, Canada) relay 4*400m - 11th place
 August 29–5 September 2001 - World Universiade (Beijing, China) 400m - 3rd place, relay 4*400m - 2nd place
 May 16, 2002- Cup of Ukraine (Kiev) 400m - 1st place
 June 11, 2002- Ukrainian Championship (Kiev) 400m - 1st place, relay 4*400m - 1st place
 July 13, 2002- Grand Prix of Sopot (Poland) 400m - 2nd place
 August 24, 2002- Grand Prix (Nitra, Slovakia) 400m - 1st place
 May 1, 2003- International Tournament (of Bar, Montenegro), 400m - 1st place
 May 17, 2003 - All-Ukrainian Student Games (Kiev) 400m - II place, relay 4*400m - 1st place
 May 26, 2003 - Cup of Ukraine (Kiev) 400m - 1st place
 May 31, 2003 - International Tournament (Barselona Palafrugell, Spain) 400m - 2nd place
 June 21, 2003 - European Cup (Ljubljana, Slovenia) relay 4*400m - 2nd place
 July 4, 2003 - Spartakiada of Ukraine (Kiev) 400m - 1st place
 August 25 - September 3, 2003 - The World Universiade (Degu, Korea) 400m - 1st place, 4* 400m - 1st place
 May 29, 2004 - Cup of Ukraine (Kiev) 400m - 2nd place
 June 5, 2004 - International Competition (Poland) relay 4*400m- 1st place
 June 13, 2004 - International Tournament (Tartu, Estonia) 400m - 1st place
 June 20, 2004 - European Cup (Sofia, Bulgaria) relay 4*400m - 1st place
 June 25, 2004 - International Tournament (Dublin, Ireland) 400m - 3rd place
 July 4, 2004 - Ukrainian Championship (Yalta) 400m - 1st place
 August 27, 2004 - Olympic Games (Athens, Greece) relay 4*400m – 10th place
 May 27, 2005 - International Tournament (Riga, Latvia) 400m - 2nd place
 June 4, 2005 - International Tournament (Istanbul, Turkey) 400m - 1st place
 June 19, 2005 - European Cup (Lier, Portugal) relay 4* 400m - 2nd place
 June 24, 2005 - International Tournament (Belfast, Northern Ireland) - 400m - 2nd place
 July 3, 2005 - Championship of Ukraine (Kiev) 400m - 1st place
 August 6, 2005 - World Championships (Helsinki, Finland)- 9th place
 June 29, 2006 - European Cup (Malaga, Spain) Dorm Olympics 4*400m - 5th place
 July 22, 2006 - Championship of Ukraine (Kharkov) 400m - 3rd place
 August 13, 2006 - European Championships (Moscow, Gothenburg, Sweden) 4*400m Relay - 5th place

Education 
He went in Kharkov National University from 1994 to 2001. He is a specialist in physical education, coach and sport manager of the following athletes:
 Gorbachev Pavel - run with obstacles 400m (Championship of Ukraine 60m run with obstacles - 2nd place)
 Bikulov Dmytriy - run 400m
 Tverdostup Tamara - run 800m and run 1500m

References 

1977 births
Living people
Ukrainian male sprinters
Olympic athletes of Ukraine
Athletes (track and field) at the 2004 Summer Olympics
Universiade medalists in athletics (track and field)
Ukrainian athletics coaches
Universiade gold medalists for Ukraine
Medalists at the 2001 Summer Universiade
Medalists at the 2003 Summer Universiade